Thank You for the Rain is a 2017 feature-length documentary film created by Julia Dahr and Kisilu Musya produced by Hugh Hartford. The film follows Kisilu Musya over five years, from small scale farmer to climate activist on a global scale. The film had its world-premiere at Copenhagen International Documentary Festival, and has since toured more than 80 festivals. The film has sold to over 60 countries, earlier versions of the film were bought by Al Jazeera and NRK, and screened at the 2015 United Nations Climate Change Conference in Paris. The film is a co-production between Differ Media and Banyak Films.

Five years ago Kisilu, a Kenyan farmer, started to use his camera to capture the life of his family, his village and the damages of climate change. When a violent storm throws him and a Norwegian filmmaker together we see him transform from a father, to community leader to an activist on the global stage. Thank You for the Rain is an inspiring and captivating tale of an indefatigable optimist, who nonetheless tests his limits in the fight for a greener world.

Thank You for the Rain is a collaborative film made by Kisilu Musya, a Kenyan farmer, climate fighter and video diarist, and Julia Dahr, a Norwegian filmmaker. Living in completely different parts of the world, Kisilu and Julia found each through this project, and have been working together for more than five years to complete Thank You For The Rain.

Reception 
Thank You for the Rain has received acclaim by critics. The film has won several awards including Best Documentary at the Kenyan Kalasha Awards and two awards at Social Impact Media Awards in 2018. The film has won 16 awards, and has competed at 28 international festivals.

 Winner: Best Cinematography, Women in Film and Television, Canada 2019
 Winner: Basil Wright Film Prize, Rai Film Festival, UK 2019
 Winner: Best film on sustainable development, Millenium Film Festival, 2018 Belgium
 Winner: Best Story, Naturvision Film Festival 2018
 Winner: Ethos Jury Prize, Social Media Impact Awards, United States 2018
 Winner: Best Cinematography, Social Media Impact Awards, United States 2018
 Winner: The Main Prize of the Minister of the Environment, IFF Ekofilm, Chzech Republic 2018
 Winner: Best Documentary Film, Kalasha Film and TV Awards, Kenya 2018
 Winner: WWF Award, Thessaloniki Documentary Festival, Greece 2018
 Winner: Best Movie, Nuovi Sguardi, Italy 2018
 Winner: Jury Prize, Another Way Film festival, Spain 2017
 Winner: Osiris FAO Prize, Agrofilm, Slovakia 2017
 Winner: Fethi Kayaalp Grand Award, Bozcaada International Festival of Ecological Documentary, Turkey 2017
 Winner: Jury Award, Alimenterre Film Festival, Belgium 2017
 Winner: Pangolin Power Film Award, Eco Film Festival, Singapore 2017
 Winner: Best Feature Documentary, FICMEC, Spain 2017

Impact 

In 2017 an international impact campaign was launched, aiming to build climate resilient communities, strengthen the climate justice movement, and push policymakers to take steps to stop climate change and support frontline communities. In 2019 and 2020 the campaign has received funding from Climate Justice Resilience Fund which will be used to strengthen and expand the work of building climate resilient communities in East Africa. This involves building earth dams and irrigation projects as well as the community screenings with farmers. We aim to use the film as a tool to create an arena where farmers, NGOs and local decision makers can meet to identify local challenges and discuss suitable climate solutions.

Another aim of the impact campaign is to help students around the world better understand the issue of climate change, through educational toolkits available to be used with the film, linked to national curricula in the UK, the US, Canada and Norway. There have also been a large number of community screenings organized by NGOs, activists and civil society groups around Europe. Feedback from organizers suggests that Thank You For The Rain's personal approach to climate change makes a powerful impact on the audiences, and helps bring home an issue that is often seen as complex or distant.

References

External links 
 
 

2017 films
2017 documentary films
2017 in Kenya
2017 in the environment
Documentary films about environmental issues
Films set in Kenya
Films set in Africa
Films shot in Kenya
2010s English-language films